Abdul Momin Chowdhury (born 22 January 1940) is a Bangladeshi historian and academic. He was the Vice-chancellor of National University of Bangladesh and Primeasia University, Bangladesh. He also served as the President of Bangladesh History Association and Asiatic Society of Bangladesh.

Early life and education
Chowdhury was born to Abdul Wadud Chowdhury and Shirin Begum in 1940. He passed Matriculation from Armanitola Government High School, Dhaka in 1954 and I.A. from Dhaka College, Dhaka in 1956. He completed B.A. (Honors) and M.A. in history in 1959 and 1960 respectively from the University of Dhaka. He achieved Ph.D. from the School of Oriental and African Studies (SOAS), University of London in 1965. He did post-doctoral research at SOAS from 1975 to 1976 as a Commonwealth Fellow. He spent an academic year (2013-2014) at Vanderbilt University, Nashville, Tennessee, U.S., as a visiting scholar with a Senior Fulbright Fellowship.

Career
Chowdhury started his teaching career as a lecturer of history at Dhaka University in 1961. He became a professor in 1978 and served there until 2013. In long professional career, he was the Chairman of the Department of History, Librarian (in addition to teaching), Dean of the Faculty of Arts, Member of the Syndicate and Senate at the University of Dhaka.

He was associated with various learned professional organizations. He served as the General Secretary and President of Bangladesh History Association. He was President of the  Asiatic Society of Bangladesh (ASB), as well. He is a respected Fellow of the ASB.

He served as the vice-chancellor of National University of Bangladesh and Primeasia University, Bangladesh.

Works
Chowdhury has written a number of books and published more than 40 research articles in national and international journals. One of his widely acclaimed books is Dynastic History of Bengal (750-1200 A.D.), Asiatic Society of Pakistan, Dacca, 1967.

References 

Vice-Chancellors of National University Bangladesh
University of Dhaka alumni
Academic staff of the University of Dhaka
Alumni of the University of London
1940 births
Dhaka College alumni
Vanderbilt University alumni
20th-century Bangladeshi historians
Living people
21st-century Bangladeshi historians